Nasutonops is a genus of spiders in the family Caponiidae. It was first described in 2016 by Brescovit & Sánchez-Ruiz. , it contains 3 species, all from Brazil.

References

Caponiidae
Araneomorphae genera
Spiders of Brazil